Neilson Powless (born September 3, 1996) is an American professional road racing cyclist who currently rides for UCI WorldTeam . Powless, who is Oneida, is the first US Native American to compete in the Tour de France.

Career
In August 2019, he was named in the startlist for the 2019 Vuelta a España. Powless, along with Jumbo-Visma teammates Robert Gesink, George Bennett and Sepp Kuss, each finished between 27th and 33rd in the overall standings en route to assisting Primož Roglič in winning the race.

The next season he changed teams to EF Pro Cycling. In August 2020, he was named on the startlist for the 2020 Tour de France. He rode in support of GC contender and team leader Rigoberto Urán. During this tour he got involved in a breakaway and earned a top 5 stage finish.

Following his strong debut, Powless again was named as part of the EF Team for the 2021 Tour de France. Early in the season he finished 5th in the 2021 UAE Tour, in July he won the 2021 Clásica de San Sebastián, becoming only the second American to do so, and late in the season he finished 5th in the UCI world championship.

During the 2022 Tour de Suisse Powless was active in several breakaways and stayed with the overall leaders throughout the entire race finishing in 4th place overall.

He was added to the start list for the 2022 Tour de France, joining Nairo Quintana as the other Indigenous American rider to start the race. On stage 5 of the Tour, a particularly brutal stage with many cobbled sections, he joined a breakaway that survived to the finish. Overall leader Wout van Aert crashed multiple times giving Powless the chance to move into the yellow jersey. Van Aert was able to limit his losses, but Powless moved into 2nd place overall. At +0:13 this was the closest an American had come to wearing the leader's jersey since Tejay van Garderen tied for the lead in the first week of the 2018 edition. The next day he came within +0:04 of the lead, but Tadej Pogačar seized control of the race and on stage 7 Powless began to fall back. Powless was active in other breakaways throughout the race including being the only rider to attack on kilometer zero of stage 12, which culminated on Alpe d'Huez. Several dozen riders attacked throughout the day but very few survived ahead of the GC favorites. Powless did survive, and placed fourth, he also advanced as high as 3rd place in the mountains classification by the start of the third week. He ultimately finished the Tour in 13th, the highest ranked rider on the team and the only Team EF rider inside the top 25.

Personal life
His mother Jen Allred ran the marathon for Guam at the 1992 Summer Olympics. His older sister is fellow professional racing cyclist Shayna Powless.

Major results

2016
 1st  Overall Joe Martin Stage Race
 1st Stage 8 Tour de l'Avenir
 1st Stage 3 Redlands Bicycle Classic
 1st Stage 3a (ITT) Tour de Beauce
 1st Stage 1 (TTT) Olympia's Tour
 9th Overall Tour of California
1st  Young rider classification
2017
 National Under-23 Road Championships
1st  Road race
3rd Time trial
 1st Gran Premio Palio del Recioto
 National Road Championships
2nd Road race
3rd Time trial
 3rd Overall Le Triptyque des Monts et Châteaux
1st Stage 3a (ITT)
 4th Overall Tour of Utah
1st  Young rider classification
 6th Overall Giro Ciclistico d'Italia
1st Stage 1
 6th Giro del Belvedere
2018
 7th Overall Tour of Britain
1st Stage 5 (TTT)
 9th Overall Settimana Internazionale di Coppi e Bartali
 10th Raiffeisen Grand Prix
2019
 National Road Championships
2nd Time trial
3rd Road race
 7th Overall Volta ao Algarve
 7th Japan Cup
2020
 4th Overall Herald Sun Tour
2021
 1st Clásica de San Sebastián 
 5th Road race, UCI Road World Championships
 5th Overall UAE Tour
 6th Coppa Sabatini
2022
 1st Japan Cup
 3rd Maryland Cycling Classic
 4th Overall Tour de Suisse
 8th Liège–Bastogne–Liège
2023
 1st  Overall Étoile de Bessèges
 1st Grand Prix La Marseillaise
 3rd Overall Tour des Alpes-Maritimes et du Var
 6th Overall Paris–Nice
 7th Milan–San Remo

Grand Tour general classification results timeline

Classics results timeline

References

External links

1996 births
Living people
American male cyclists
Oneida people
People from Roseville, California
Cyclists from California
Native American sportspeople